Montenegro made its Paralympic Games début at the 2008 Summer Paralympics in Beijing, following its split with Serbia. It had previously competed as part of Serbia and Montenegro in 2004; and as part of Yugoslavia before that.

Montenegro's delegation to the 2008 Summer Paralympics consisted in a single athlete, Dušan Dragović, who competed in swimming and did not win a medal. Montenegro has never participated in the Winter Paralympic Games. Montenegro was represented by 1 athlete in 2012 and 2 in 2016.

At the Tokyo 2020 Paralympic Games, Montenegrin’s sole representative Filip Radović won bronze in men's table tennis, the first medal in Montenegrin Paralympic history.

Full results for Montenegro at the Paralympics

See also
 Montenegro at the Olympics

References